Al-Shabab Club is a Bahraini football club based in Jidhafs. They used to play in the top division of Bahraini football. They share the Bahrain National Stadium with other clubs.

Achievements
Bahraini King's Cup: 1 2004

Past players
Hakeem al-Araibi (2009–12)
Abdul Aziz Yusif (2016–17)

Political interference
After the Bahraini uprising of 2011, Al-Shabab was one of two teams dissolved for allegedly being involved in Shia agitation. They were later reinstated, but demoted to Bahrain’s second tier.

References

External links
 Club profile – goalzz.com

Football clubs in Bahrain
2001 establishments in Bahrain
Association football clubs established in 2001